Plainfield Historic District is a national historic district located at Plainfield, Hendricks County, Indiana.  The district encompasses 174 contributing buildings in the central business district and surrounding residential area of Plainfield.  The district developed between about 1840 and 1959 and includes notable examples of Greek Revival, Gothic Revival, Italianate, Queen Anne, and Bungalow / American Craftsman style architecture.  Notable buildings include the Ezra Cox House (c. 1861–1863), Oscar Hadley House (1891), Plainfield Carnegie Library (1912), Plainfield Methodist Episcopal Church (1891), Bly Bros. Dry Goods Store (c. 1880), Knights of Pythias Building (c. 1900), Prewitt Theater (1927), First National Bank of Plainfield (1903), Mansion House Hotel (1874), Fisher's Tavern (c. 1840), and Quaker Meeting House (1857-1858).

It was added to the National Register of Historic Places in 2010.

References

Historic districts on the National Register of Historic Places in Indiana
Greek Revival architecture in Indiana
Gothic Revival architecture in Indiana
Italianate architecture in Indiana
Queen Anne architecture in Indiana
National Register of Historic Places in Hendricks County, Indiana
Historic districts in Hendricks County, Indiana